Greensboro is the southernmost town in Orleans County, Vermont, United States. The population was 811 at the 2020 census. The town includes the places of Campbells Corners, East Greensboro, Gebbie Corner, Greensboro Four Corners, Greensboro Bend, Tolman(s) Corner, and Burlington Point. Greensboro Bend and the central village of Greensboro are classified as census-designated places.

History
Greensboro was chartered in 1781.  The town was named for Timothy Green, one of the original charter recipients and an original landowner under the charter.  However, there is no evidence that he ever visited the town, and his land was sold for non-payment of taxes a few decades after he received it.:13-14 Only three of the original proprietors settled in the town; most likely, the others were land speculators who sold their land to others or let it be sold at tax sales when buyers could not be found.:18

The Bayley Hazen Military Road, built before the town was chartered, allowed its development. The road passed to the west of Caspian Lake, and a wooden blockhouse was constructed there in 1779:21-22 on what is now known as Block House Hill:frontispiece. In 1781, the blockhouse's party of four was attacked by Abenaki; two were killed and two were captured.:22-23 A second road was built by Timothy Hinman between 1791 and 1793. This road, which came to be known as the Hinman Settler Road, branched off from the Bayley-Hazen in Greensboro and continued to Derby. These two roads were of major importance to the settlement of northern Vermont.:23

The town sent many soldiers to fight in the Civil War. Of eight prisoners of war from the town, confined to Andersonville Prison, one returned.

In the early 20th century, a development near the Highland Lodge contained restrictive covenants in the title forbidding subsequent resale to Jews. These restrictions were found to be illegal by the US Supreme Court in 1948.

The Highland Lodge opened in 1954. It had a hotel and restaurant that was open year-round. It had a beach on Caspian Lake with sailboats, kayaks, and canoes; children's play programs and nature programs in the summer and nature hikes and cross-country ski trails in the winter. Special events included wedding, business retreats, music programs, workshops, and talks. It was largely closed in 2011, being open only for room and cottage rentals, but a group of investors purchased the property in December, 2016 and have reopened the Lodge and restaurant seasonally.

Geography
According to the United States Census Bureau, the town has a total area of 39.4 square miles (102.0 km2), of which 37.8 square miles (97.8 km2) is land and 1.6 square miles (4.2 km2) (4.11%) is water.

The town includes Caspian Lake and most of Eligo Pond, also known as Lake Eligo.

Demographics

As of the census of 2000, there were 770 people, 313 households, and 215 families residing in the town.  The population density was 20.4 people per square mile (7.9/km2).  There were 773 housing units at an average density of 20.5 per square mile (7.9/km2).  The racial makeup of the town was 96.36% White, 0.13% African American, 0.78% Native American, and 2.73% from two or more races. Hispanic or Latino of any race were 0.65% of the population.

There were 313 households, out of which 28.4% had children under the age of 18 living with them, 57.2% were married couples living together, 8.3% had a female householder with no husband present, and 31.3% were non-families. 27.2% of all households were made up of individuals, and 16.0% had someone living alone who was 65 years of age or older.  The average household size was 2.37 and the average family size was 2.84.

In the town, the population was spread out, with 21.9% under the age of 18, 5.6% from 18 to 24, 23.1% from 25 to 44, 28.8% from 45 to 64, and 20.5% who were 65 years of age or older.  The median age was 44 years. For every 100 females, there were 85.5 males.  For every 100 females age 18 and over, there were 78.9 males.

Government

Town

 Moderator – Timothy Nisbet
 Chair, Selectboard – Susan Wood
 Town Clerk – Kim Greaves
 Asst. Town Clerk – Kim Greaves, Jeanne Eisner
 Treasurer – Barbara Brooke
 Auditor – Patricia Mercier
 Auditor – Marsha Gadoury
 Lister – Kim Greaves
 Lister – Kristen Leahy
 Lister – Harold Tolman
 Trustee of Public Funds – Sherral Lumsden
 Library Trustee – Debbie Kasper
 Agent – David Smith
 Grand Juror – David Smith
 Water Board – Keith Meyers, John Mackin, Craig Dezell

School District

 Member, District School Board – Wayne Young
 Treasurer – Lorraine Tolman
 Member Lakeview Elementary School Board – Patricia Launer
 Member, Lakeview Elementary School Board – Mateo Kehler
 Member, Hazen School Board – Ed Karp

Economy

Personal income

The median income for a household in the town was $34,583, and the median income for a family was $40,917. Males had a median income of $31,250 versus $20,917 for females. The per capita income for the town was $19,396.  About 3.7% of families and 6.9% of the population were below the poverty line, including 11.3% of those under age 18 and 5.4% of those age 65 or over.

Greensboro has the highest per capita income in Orleans County for a town. Newport city is higher. Greensboro's income ranks it 129th out of 282 census areas in Vermont.

Industry

Circus Smirkus, a non-profit youth circus, is based here.  The company was founded in Greensboro by Rob Mermin in 1987.

The Greensboro Arts Alliance and Residency (GAAR), the summer wing of The Mirror Theater Ltd, was formed here in 2005 to mix professional Mirror Repertory Company members with local community members.  In 2016, GAAR performed the American premiere of Joshua Sobol's Sinners, directed by Brian Cox, in Greensboro.

Hill Farmstead Brewery is a local craft brewery that was named by RateBeer in 2015 as the "Best Brewery in the World", "Best Brewery in the United States", and "Top Brewery in Vermont".  It was previously voted the Best Brewery in the World in 2012 and 2014 as well.

Jasper Hill Farm was awarded "Best Unpasteurized Cheese" for its Bayley Hazen Blue at the 2014 World Cheese Awards in London.

Tourism

Caspian Lake is surrounded by cottages, many available for summer rental.
The lake is used for boating, sailing and fishing. There is a public beach at the south end, in town, with a boat ramp.
There are two inns in town, Highland Lodge, which rents rooms and cottages, and Lakeview Inn, which holds group events.

Ice fishing is popular.

Greensboro has a nine-hole golf course, Mountain View, since circa 1895, with views of the lake and Mount Mansfield.

Community
The Greensboro Association was founded in 1934 to conceive, advance, and support village initiatives and organizations.

Greensboro was the setting of a short film called The Abels House is Green directed by part-time resident Duncan M. Rogers.

The hub of town is a general store called Willeys.

The Green Mountain Monastery, a community of women, was formed here in 1999.

Notable people 

 Alfred Barr, art historian and the first director of the Museum of Modern Art. He is buried in the town cemetery under a tombstone designed by architect Philip Johnson
 Greta Garbo visited friends in the town in her later years
 Robert Gilpin, professor emeritus at Princeton University
 Warner A. Graham, Associate Justice of the Vermont Supreme Court
 Andrew Johnson, cross-country skier
 Bliss Perry, scholar and editor
 Benjamin H. Randall, politician and businessman
 William Hubbs Rehnquist, Chief Justice of the United States
 Wallace Stegner, Pulitzer Prize-winning author

References

External links

 Town website
 http://www.greensboroassociation.org/

 
Towns in Vermont
Towns in Orleans County, Vermont